Yukhari-Yarak is a rural locality (a selo) in Ashaga-Yaraksky Selsoviet, Khivsky District, Republic of Dagestan, Russia. The population was 349 as of 2010. There are 5 streets.

Geography 
Yukhari-Yarak is located 16 km north of Khiv (the district's administrative centre) by road. Ashaga-Yarak is the nearest rural locality.

References 

Rural localities in Khivsky District